Imre Kertész (9 November 192931 March 2016) was a Hungarian author and recipient of the 2002 Nobel Prize in Literature, "for writing that upholds the fragile experience of the individual against the barbaric arbitrariness of history". He was the first Hungarian to win the Nobel in Literature. His works deal with themes of the Holocaust (he was a survivor of German concentration and death camps), dictatorship, and personal freedom.

Life and work 
Kertész was born in Budapest, Hungary, on 9 November 1929, the son of Aranka Jakab and László Kertész, a middle-class Jewish couple. After his parents separated when he was around the age of five, Kertész attended a boarding school, and, in 1940, he started secondary school where he was put into a special class for Jewish students. During World War II, Kertész was deported in 1944 at the age of 14 with other Hungarian Jews to the Auschwitz concentration camp, and was later sent to Buchenwald. Upon his arrival at Auschwitz, Kertész claimed to be a 16-year-old worker, thus saving him from the instant extermination that awaited a 14-year-old person. After his camp was liberated in 1945, Kertész returned to Budapest, graduated from high school in 1948, and then went on to find work as a journalist and translator. In 1951, he lost his job at the journal Világosság (Clarity), after the publication started leaning towards Communism. For a short term, he worked as a factory worker, and then in the press department of the Ministry of Heavy Industry. From 1953, he started freelance journalism and translated various works into Hungarian, including Friedrich Nietzsche, Sigmund Freud, Ludwig Wittgenstein, and Elias Canetti.

His best-known work, Fatelessness (Sorstalanság), describes the experience of 15-year-old György (George) Köves in the concentration camps of Auschwitz, Buchenwald, and Zeitz. Written between 1969 and 1973, the novel was initially rejected for publication by the Communist regime in Hungary, but was published in 1975. Some have interpreted the book as quasi-autobiographical, but the author disavows a strong biographical connection. The book would go on to become part of many high school curriculums in Hungary. In 2005, a film based on the novel, for which he wrote the script, was made in Hungary. Although sharing the same title, some reviews noted that the film was more autobiographical than the novel on which it was based. It was released internationally at various dates in 2005 and 2006.

Following on from Fatelessness, Kertész's Fiasco (1988) and Kaddish for an Unborn Child (1990) are, respectively, the second and third parts of his Holocaust trilogy. His writings translated into English include Kaddish for an Unborn Child (Kaddis a meg nem született gyermekért) and Liquidation (Felszámolás), the latter set during the period of Hungary's evolution into a democracy from communist rule.

From the beginning, Kertész found little appreciation for his writing in Hungary, and he moved to Germany, where he received more active support from publishers and reviewers, along with more appreciative readers. After his move, he continued translating German works into Hungarian, notably The Birth of Tragedy, the plays of Dürrenmatt, Schnitzler, and Tankred Dorst, and various thoughts and aphorisms of Wittgenstein. Kertész also continued working at his craft, writing his fiction in Hungarian, but did not publish another novel until the late 1980s. From that point on, he submitted his work to publishers in Hungary. Grateful that he had found his most significant success as a writer and artist in Germany, Kertész left his abatement to the Academy of Arts in Berlin.

In November 2013, Kertész underwent successful surgery on his right hip, after falling down in his home. However, he continued to deal with various health concerns during the last few years of his life. He was diagnosed with Parkinson's disease, and was again suffering from depression, reported to have been a recurring battle in his life. In fact, Kertész had struggled with this same issue in his writing, as the main character of his 2003 book Felszámolás (Liquidation) commits suicide after struggling with depression.

Kertész died on 31 March 2016, at the age of 86, at his home in Budapest, after suffering from Parkinson's for several years.

Controversy 
 
Kertész was a controversial figure within Hungary, especially since being Hungary's first, and only, Nobel Laureate in Literature, he still lived in Germany. This tension was exacerbated by a 2009 interview with Die Welt, in which Kertész vowed himself a "Berliner" and called Budapest "completely balkanized". Many Hungarian newspapers reacted negatively to this statement, claiming it to be hypocritical. Other critics viewed the Budapest comment ironically, saying it represented "a grudge policy that is painfully and unmistakably, characteristically Hungarian". Kertész later clarified in a Duna TV interview that he had intended his comment to be "constructive", and called Hungary "his homeland".

Also controversial was Kertész's criticism of Steven Spielberg's depiction of the Holocaust in the 1993 film Schindler's List as "kitsch", saying: "I regard as kitsch any representation of the Holocaust that is incapable of understanding or unwilling to understand the organic connection between our own deformed mode of life (whether in the private sphere or on the level of 'civilization' as such) and the very possibility of the Holocaust."

In November 2014, Kertész was the subject of an interview with The New York Times. Kertész claimed the reporter was expecting him to question Hungary's democratic values and was shocked to hear Kertész say that "the situation in Hungary is nice, I'm having a great time". According to Kertész, "he didn't like my answer. His purpose must have been to make me call Hungary a dictatorship which it isn't. In the end, the interview was never published."

List of works 
 Sorstalanság (1975)
Fateless, translated by Christopher C. Wilson and Katharina M. Wilson (1992). Evanston, Illinois: Northwestern University Press.  and 
Fatelessness, translated by Tim Wilkinson (2004). New York: Vintage International. 
 A nyomkereső (1977)
 The Pathseeker, translated by Tim Wilkinson (2008). Brooklyn, New York: Melville House Publishing. 
 Detektívtörténet (1977)
 Detective Story, translated by Tim Wilkinson (2008). London: Harvill Secker. 
 A kudarc (1988)
 Fiasco, translated by Tim Wilkinson (2011). Brooklyn, New York: Melville House Publishing. 
 Kaddis a meg nem született gyermekért (1990)
 Kaddish for a Child Not Born, translated by Christopher C. Wilson and Katharina M. Wilson (1997). Evanston, Illinois: Hydra Books. 
 Kaddish for an Unborn Child, translated by Tim Wilkinson (2004), New York: Vintage International. 
 Az angol lobogó (1991)
 The Union Jack, translated by Tim Wilkinson (2010). Brooklyn, New York: Melville House Publishing. 
 Gályanapló (1992)
 A holocaust mint kultúra: Három előadás (1993)
 Jegyzőkönyv (1993)
 Valaki más: A változás krónikája (1997)
 A gondolatnyi csend, amíg a kivégzőosztag újratölt (1998)
 A száműzött nyelv (2001)
 Felszámolás (2003)
 Liquidation, translated by Tim Wilkinson (2004). New York: Knopf. 
 K. dosszié (2006)
 Dossier K, translated by Tim Wilkinson (2013). Brooklyn, New York: Melville House Publishing. 
 Európa nyomasztó öröksége (2008)
 Mentés másként (2011)
 A végső kocsma (2014)

Awards and honors

International prizes 
 1992, 1995: Soros Prize
 1995: 
 1997: Friedrich-Gundolf-Preis
 1997: Jeanette Schocken Preis 
 2000: Herder Prize
 2000: Welt-Literaturpreis
 2001: Pour le Mérite (Germany)
 2002: Hans Sahl Prize
 2002: Nobel Prize in Literature
 2003: YIVO Lifetime Achievement Award
 2004: Corine Literature Prize
 2004: Goethe Medal
 2009: Jean Améry Prize
 2011: Grande Médaille de Vermeil de la ville de Paris

Hungarian prizes 
 1983: Milán Füst Prize
 1986: Hieronymus Prize
 1988: Artisjus Literature Prize
 1989: Aszu Prize
 1989: Attila József Prize
 1997: Kossuth Prize
 2002: Honorary Citizen of Budapest
 2014: Hungarian Order of Saint Stephen

See also 
 Hungarian literature
 List of Jewish Nobel laureates

References

Further reading 
 Molnár, Sára. "Nobel in Literature 2002 Imre Kertész's Aesthetics of the Holocaust" CLCWeb: Comparative Literature and Culture 5.1 (2003)
 Tötösy de Zepetnek, Steven. "And the 2002 Nobel Prize for Literature Goes to Imre Kertész, Jew and Hungarian" CLCWeb: Comparative Literature and Culture 5.1 (2003)
 Tötösy de Zepetnek, Steven. "Imre Kertész's Nobel Prize, Public Discourse, and the Media" CLCWeb: Comparative Literature and Culture 7.4 (2005)
 Vasvári, Louise O., and Tötösy de Zepetnek, Steven, eds. Imre Kertész and Holocaust Literature. West Lafayette: Purdue UP, 2005. 
 Vasvári, Louise O., and Tötösy de Zepetnek, Steven, eds. Comparative Central European Holocaust Studies. West Lafayette: Purdue UP, 2009.

External links 

 Imre Kertész, Nobel Luminaries – Jewish Nobel Prize Winners, on the Beit Hatfutsot-The Museum of the Jewish People Website.
 The Last Word – an interview with Kertész from Holocaust Survivors and Remembrance Project: "Forget You Not"
 
 Imre Kertész—Nobel Lecture
List of Works
 B.-ing There, a review of the novel Liquidation by Ben Ehrenreich, Village Voice, 20 December 2004
 Haaretz article on Kertész
 2011 Interview on "Self-imposed exile and writing" with Swedish publisher Svante Weyler.
  including the Nobel Lecture 7 December 2002

1929 births
2016 deaths
Nobel laureates in Literature
Hungarian Nobel laureates
Auschwitz concentration camp survivors
Buchenwald concentration camp survivors
Hungarian expatriates in Germany
Hungarian Jews
Hungarian male novelists
Jewish novelists
Jewish Hungarian-language writers
Knights Commander of the Order of Merit of the Federal Republic of Germany
Members of the Academy of Arts, Berlin
Writers from Budapest
Recipients of the Pour le Mérite (civil class)
20th-century Hungarian male writers
21st-century Hungarian male writers
20th-century Hungarian novelists
21st-century Hungarian novelists
Herder Prize recipients
Attila József Prize recipients
Neurological disease deaths in Hungary
Deaths from Parkinson's disease
Members of the Széchenyi Academy of Literature and Arts